Yar (Jar) is a rural locality (a settlement) and the administrative center of Yarsky District, Udmurtia, Russia. Population:

References

Notes

Sources

Rural localities in Udmurtia